Love Flight (Love Flight – ) is a 2015 Thai television series starring Puttichai Kasetsin (Push) and Ungsumalynn Sirapatsakmetha (Pattie).

Directed by Ekkasit Trakulkasemsuk and produced by GMMTV, the series premiered on GMM 25 on 10 October 2015, airing on Saturdays at 18:30 ICT. The series concluded on 31 October 2015.

Cast and characters 
Below are the cast of the series:

Main 
 Puttichai Kasetsin (Push) as Neumake / Make
 Ungsumalynn Sirapatsakmetha (Pattie) as Plaifah / Fah

Supporting 
 Korapat Kirdpan (Nanon) as Ah Pat
 Kejmanee Wattanasin as Savitree
 Daweerit Chullasapya (Pae)
 Warapun Nguitragool as Pongsri
 Suporn Sangkaphibal as a grandmother
 Sutthipha Kongnawdee (Noon) as Phraeo

References

External links 
 Love Flight on GMM 25 website 
 GMMTV

Television series by GMMTV
Thai romance television series
Thai drama television series
2015 Thai television series debuts
2015 Thai television series endings
GMM 25 original programming